The 2012 Hollywood Casino 400 was a NASCAR Sprint Cup Series stock car race held on October 21, 2012, at Kansas Speedway in Kansas City, Kansas. Contested over 267 laps on the 1.5-mile (2.4 km) asphalt quad-oval, it was the thirty-second race of the 2012 Sprint Cup Series season, as well as the sixth race in the ten-race Chase for the Sprint Cup, which ends the season. Matt Kenseth of Roush Fenway Racing won the race, his third of the season. Martin Truex Jr. finished second and Paul Menard was third.

Results

Race results

Standings after the race

Drivers' Championship standings

Manufacturers' Championship standings

Note: Only the top twelve positions are included for the driver standings.

References

NASCAR races at Kansas Speedway
Hollywood Casino 400
Hollywood Casino 400
Hollywood Casino 400